Group A of the EuroBasket Women 2017 took place between 16 and 19 June 2017. The group played all of its games at Hradec Králové, Czech Republic.

Standings

All times are local (UTC+2).

Matches

Ukraine vs Czech Republic

Hungary vs Spain

Spain vs Ukraine

Czech Republic vs Hungary

Hungary vs Ukraine

Czech Republic vs Spain

External links
Official website

Group A
2016–17 in Ukrainian basketball
2016–17 in Czech basketball
2016–17 in Spanish women's basketball
2016–17 in Hungarian basketball